A pantry is a room or cupboard where beverages, food, and sometimes dishes, household cleaning products, linens or provisions are stored within a home or office. Food and beverage pantries serve in an ancillary capacity to the kitchen.

Etymology

History in Europe and United States

Late Middle Ages
In a late medieval hall, there were separate rooms for the various service functions and food storage. The pantry was where bread was kept and food preparation was done. The head of the office who is responsible for this room is referred to as a pantler. There were similar rooms for storage of bacon and other meats (larder), alcoholic beverages (buttery, known for the "butts", or barrels, stored there), and cooking (kitchen).

Colonial Era
In the United States, pantries evolved from early Colonial American "butteries", built in a cold north corner of a colonial home (more commonly referred to and spelled as "butt'ry"), into a variety of pantries in self-sufficient farmsteads. Butler's pantries, or China pantries, were built between the dining room and kitchen of a middle-class English or American home, especially in the latter part of the 19th into the early 20th centuries. Great estates, such as the Biltmore Estate in Asheville, North Carolina or Stan Hywet Hall in Akron, Ohio, had many pantries and other domestic "offices", echoing their British "Great House" counterparts.

Victorian Era
By the Victorian era, large houses and estates in Britain maintained the use of separate rooms, each one dedicated to distinct stages of food preparation and cleanup. The kitchen was for cooking, while food was stored in a storeroom, pantry or cellar. Meat preparation was done in a larder as game would come in undressed, fish unfilleted, and meat in half or quarter carcasses, and vegetable cleaning and preparation would be done in the scullery. Dishwashing was done in a scullery or butler's pantry, "depending on the type of dish and level of dirt". 

Since the scullery was the room with running water, it had a sink, and it was where the messiest food preparation took place, such as cleaning fish and cutting raw meat. The pantry was where tableware was stored, such as China, glassware, and silverware. If the pantry had a sink for washing tableware, it was a wooden sink lined with lead, to prevent chipping the China and glassware while they were being washed. In some middle-class houses, the larder, pantry, and storeroom might simply be large wooden cupboards, each with its exclusive purpose.

Types

Asian Pantry 

Traditionally, kitchens in Asia have been more open format than those of the West. The function of the pantry was generally served by wooden cabinetry. For example, in Japan, a kitchen cabinet is called a "mizuya tansu". A substantial tradition of woodworking and cabinetry in general developed in Japan, especially throughout the Tokugawa period. A huge number of designs for tansu (chests or cabinets) were made, each tailored towards one specific purpose or another.

The idea is very similar to that of the Hoosier cabinet, with a wide variety of functions being served by specific design innovations.

Butler's pantry

A butler's pantry or serving pantry is a utility room in a large house, primarily used to store serving items, rather than food. Traditionally, a butler's pantry was used for cleaning, counting, and storage of silver; European butlers often slept in the pantry, as their job was to keep the silver under lock and key. The merchant's account books, and wine log may also have been kept in there. The room would be used by the butler and other domestic staff; it is often called a butler's pantry even in households where there is no butler.

In modern houses, butler's pantries are usually located in transitional spaces between kitchens and dining rooms and are used as staging areas for serving meals. They commonly contain countertops, as well as storage for candles, serving pieces, table linens, tableware, wine, and other dining room articles. More elaborate versions may include dishwashers, refrigerators, or sinks.

Butler's pantries have become popular in recent times.

Cold pantry 

Certain foods, such as butter, eggs, and milk, need to be kept cool. Before modern refrigeration was available, iceboxes were popular. However, the problem with an icebox was that the cabinet housing it was large, but the actual refrigerated space was relatively small, so a clever and innovative solution was invented, the "cold pantry", sometimes called a "California cooler." The cold pantry usually consisted of a cabinet or cupboard with wooden-slat shelves (for air circulation). An opening near the top vented to the outside, either through the roof or high out the wall. A second opening near the bottom vented also to the outside, but low near the ground and usually on the north side of the house, where the air was cooler. As the air in the pantry warmed, it rose, escaping through the upper vent.  This in turn drew cooler air in from the lower vent, providing constant circulation of cooler air. In the summertime, the temperature in the cold pantry would usually hover several degrees lower than the ambient temperature in the house, while in the wintertime, the temperature in the cold pantry would be considerably lower than that in the house.

A cold pantry was the perfect place to keep food stocks that did not necessarily need to be kept refrigerated.  Breads, butter, cheesecakes, eggs, pastries, and pie were the common food stocks kept in a cold pantry. Vegetables could be brought up from the root cellar in smaller amounts and stored in the cold pantry until ready to use. With space in the icebox at a premium, the cold pantry was a great place to store fresh berries and fruit.

Hoosier Cabinet 

First developed in the early 1900s by the Hoosier Manufacturing Company in New Castle, Indiana, and popular into the 1930s, the Hoosier cabinet and its many imitators soon became an essential fixture in American kitchens. Often billed as a "pantry and kitchen in one", the Hoosier brought the ease and readiness of a pantry, with its many storage spaces and working counter, right into the kitchen. It was sold in catalogues and through a unique sales program geared towards farm wives. Today, the Hoosier cabinet is a much sought-after domestic icon and widely reproduced.

Books

Chapters of earlier books, particularly written during the era of domestic science and home economics in the latter half of the 19th century, featured how to furnish, keep, and clean a pantry. Catharine E. Beecher and Harriet Beecher Stowe, in their seminal The American Woman's Home (1869), advocated the elimination of the pantry by installing pantry shelving and cabinetry in the kitchen. This idea did not take hold in American households until a century later, by which time the pantry had become a floor-to-ceiling cabinet in the Post-Vietnam War kitchen. During the Victorian era and until the Second World War, when housing changed considerably, pantries were commonplace in virtually all American homes. This was because kitchens were small and strictly utilitarian, and not the domestic, often well-appointed, center of the home enjoyed today or in Colonial times. Thus, pantries were important workspaces with their built-in shelving, cupboards and countertops.

In the last chapter of These Happy Golden Years, Laura Ingalls Wilder wrote a descriptive account of the pantry that Almanzo Wilder built for her in their first home together in DeSmet, South Dakota. It details a working farmhouse pantry in great detail, which she sees for the first time after her marriage to Wilder and subsequent journey to their new home.

Pantry raids were often common themes in children's literature and early 20th century advertising. Perhaps the most famous pantry incident in literature was when Mark Twain's Tom Sawyer had to do penance for getting into his Aunt Polly's jam in her pantry: as punishment, he had to whitewash her fence.

See also 
 Larder
 Root cellar
 Shaker-style pantry box
 Utility room

References

Further reading

External links 

Food storage
Rooms